Katrin Splitt (born 11 August 1977) is a German former adaptive rower who competed at international elite competitions. She is a Paralympic silver medalist and a two-time World bronze medalist in the mixed coxed four.

References

External links
 
 

1977 births
Living people
Rowers from Berlin
German female rowers
Paralympic rowers of Germany
Rowers at the 2012 Summer Paralympics
Medalists at the 2012 Summer Paralympics
World Rowing Championships medalists for Germany